Pronephrium is a genus of ferns in the family Thelypteridaceae in the family Thelypteridaceae, subfamily Thelypteridoideae, in the Pteridophyte Phylogeny Group classification of 2016 (PPG I). Other sources sink Pronephrium into a very broadly defined genus Thelypteris. Some species were split off into the genera Abacopteris, Grypothrix and Menisciopsis in 2021 as a result of a phylogenetic study of the family Thelypteridaceae.

The genus was first described in 1851 by Carl Borivoj Presl.

Species
, the Checklist of Ferns and Lycophytes of the World accepted the following species and hybrids:

Pronephrium affine (Blume) C.Presl
Pronephrium amboinense (Willd.) Holttum
Pronephrium amphitrichum Holttum
Pronephrium aoristisorum (Harr.) S.E.Fawc. & A.R.Sm.
Pronephrium aquatiloides (Copel.) Holttum
Pronephrium borneense (Hook.) Holttum
Pronephrium camarinense (Holttum) S.E.Fawc. & A.R.Sm.
Pronephrium celebicum (Baker) Holttum
Pronephrium clemensiae (Copel.) Holttum
Pronephrium euryphyllum (Rosenst.) Holttum
Pronephrium exsculptum (Baker) Holttum
Pronephrium fidelei Rakotondr.
Pronephrium firmulum (Baker) Holttum
Pronephrium giluwense Holttum
Pronephrium granulosum (C.Presl) Holttum
Pronephrium hewittii (Copel.) Holttum
Pronephrium hosei (Baker) Holttum
Pronephrium inaequilobatum (Holttum) S.E.Fawc. & A.R.Sm.
Pronephrium kjellbergii Holttum
Pronephrium lineatum (Blume) C.Presl
Pronephrium manuselense M.Kato
Pronephrium marojejyensis Rakotondr.
Pronephrium menisciicarpon (Blume) Holttum
Pronephrium merrillii (Christ) Holttum
Pronephrium millarae Holttum
Pronephrium minahassae Holttum
Pronephrium moniliforme (Tagawa & K.Iwats.) Holttum
Pronephrium murkelense (M.Kato) S.E.Fawc. & A.R.Sm.
Pronephrium nervosum (Fee) S.E.Fawc. & A.R.Sm.
Pronephrium palauense (Hosok.) Holttum
Pronephrium peltatum (Alderw.) Holttum
Pronephrium peramalense Holttum
Pronephrium philippinum (C.Presl) S.E.Fawc. & A.R.Sm.
Pronephrium rhombeum (Christ) Holttum
Pronephrium samarense (Copel.) Holttum
Pronephrium simillimum (C.Chr.) Holttum
Pronephrium solsonicum Holttum
Pronephrium thysanoides Holttum
Pronephrium trachyphyllum Holttum
Pronephrium xiphioides (Christ) Holttum

Hybrids
Pronephrium × interruptum Holttum
Pronephrium × liukiuense (Christ) Nakaike
Pronephrium × occultum (C.Hope) comb.ined.

References

Thelypteridaceae
Fern genera
Taxa described in 1851
Taxa named by Carl Borivoj Presl